The 1995 BMW Open was a men's Association of Tennis Professionals tennis tournament held in Munich, Germany and played on outdoor clay courts. The event was part of the World Series of the 1995 ATP Tour. It was the 79th edition of the tournament and was held from 1 May through 8 May 1995. Wayne Ferreira won the singles title.

Finals

Singles

 Wayne Ferreira defeated  Michael Stich 7–5, 7–6(8–6)
 It was Ferreira's 2nd title of the year and the 13th of his career.

Doubles

 Trevor Kronemann /  David Macpherson defeated  Luis Lobo /  Javier Sánchez 6–3, 6–4
 It was Kronemann's 3rd title of the year and the 5th of his career. It was Macpherson's 3rd title of the year and the 11th of his career.

References

External links 
 ATP tournament profile
 ITF tournament details

 
BMW Open
Bavarian International Tennis Championships